Amy McIlroy (née Brenton, born 22 March 1991) is a New Zealand lawn bowls player. She competed at the 2014 Commonwealth Games as part of the women's triples and women's fours teams. She won a bronze medal in the women's fours events along with teammates Mandy Boyd, Selina Goddard and Val Smith.

Born Amy Brenton, McIlroy attended Nelson's Nayland College. She married fellow lawn bowls player Shannon McIlroy in January 2013.

References

External links
Amy McIlroy at Bowls New Zealand

1991 births
Living people
New Zealand female bowls players
Commonwealth Games bronze medallists for New Zealand
Bowls players at the 2014 Commonwealth Games
Commonwealth Games medallists in lawn bowls
20th-century New Zealand women
21st-century New Zealand women
Medallists at the 2014 Commonwealth Games
People educated at Nayland College
Sportspeople from Nelson, New Zealand